Leviathan, in comics, may refer to:

 Leviathan, an alias used by Legion of Super-Heroes member Gim Allon
 Leviathan (Marvel Comics), a fictional Soviet-based terrorist organization
 Leviathan (DC Comics), a criminal organization run by Batman villain Talia al Ghul in Batman Inc. and Batman Incorporated
 Leviathan (2000 AD), a story from 2000 AD
 Leviathan (comic strip), a British comic strip from the Independent on Sunday
 Leviathan, the original alias of Marvel Comics character Edward Cobert, better known as Gargantua
 Leviathan, a Marvel Comics character who appeared in Nick Fury, Agent of S.H.I.E.L.D.